William Maples may refer to:

 William R. Maples (1937–1997), American forensic anthropologist 
 William Maples (cricketer) (1820–1854), English cricketer